Valtin may refer to:

Albert Valtin (1937–2015), Soviet basketball player
Jan Valtin (1905–1951), alias of Richard Julius Hermann Krebs, German Soviet spy
Le Valtin, commune in Lorraine, France
Rolf Valtin (1925–2018), American soccer player